Millson may refer to:

Greg Millson, former drummer in the Canadian band "Great Lake Swimmers"
John Millson (1808–1874), U.S. Representative from Virginia
John Millson (Canadian politician), Canadian politician and businessman
Joseph Millson (born 1974), English actor and singer

See also
Port Hope (Millson Field) Aerodrome west northwest of Port Hope, Ontario, Canada
Milson (disambiguation)
Mylson